Little green men are masked soldiers of the Russian Federation who appeared during the Russo-Ukrainian War in 2014 in unmarked green army uniforms and carrying weapons and equipment.

The term first arose during the occupation of Crimea by the Russian Federation, a period from late February to March 2014, when such forces occupied and blockaded the Simferopol International Airport, most military bases in Crimea, and the parliament in Simferopol. The term also sometimes used to refer to Russian troops during the war in Donbas, as the Kremlin denied their official involvement or presence of their troops in the region, and they wore unmarked uniforms or disguised themselves as pro-Russian separatists. 

Russian media referred to them with the euphemism "polite people" due to their well-mannered behavior, as they kept to themselves and mostly made no effort to interfere with civilian life.

The Russian Federation initially denied that these were Russian military forces, but on 17 April 2014 Russian President Vladimir Putin finally confirmed the presence of the Russian military. Furthermore, numerous sources, including Russian state media, have confirmed that the "little green men" were a mix of operatives from the Special Operations Forces and various other Spetsnaz GRU units. It likely also included paratroopers of the 45th Guards Spetsnaz Brigade of the VDV, and Wagner Group military contractors. While their status as troops acting under the orders of the Russian government was continually denied, their nationality was not. Alexander Borodai, Prime Minister of the self-declared Donetsk People's Republic, stated that 50,000 Russian citizens fought in the Donbas up to August 2015, and argued that they should receive the same benefits as Russia's other war veterans (while still proclaiming that the government did not send them).

Weapons and equipment analysis
In March 2014, the Finnish magazine Suomen Sotilas (Soldier of Finland) published an analysis of the weapons and equipment seen on photos of "little green men".

The article points to a number of weapons and pieces of equipment that it asserts are issued only to armed forces in the Russian Federation:
 New EMR camouflage combat uniforms
 New 6Sh112 or 6Sh117 tactical vest
 New , 6B7-1M composite helmet
 New 7.62 mm PKP machine guns
 6B26 composite helmets (used only by airborne troops of the Russian Federation)
 6Sh92-5 tactical vest (used only by airborne troops of the Russian Federation)
 Gorka-3 combat uniform (used only by Russian special forces and mountain troops)
 Smersh AK/VOG tactical vest (used only by Russian special forces)

The article goes on to conclude that with a very high probability "these troops are the 45th Guards Separate Reconnaissance Regiment of the VDV" based in Kubinka, Moscow.

Other media have published a photo of an unmarked Russian soldier armed with a VSS Vintorez taken as proof of deployment of Russian special forces.

Official Russian reaction
Initially, President of Russia Vladimir Putin stated that the men in green were not part of the Russian Armed Forces, but groups of local militia who had seized their weapons from the Ukrainian Army. The SACEUR of NATO Allied Command Operations General Philip Breedlove said that these "green men" were in fact Russian troops.

In March 2014, Putin continued to maintain that there was no pre-planned intervention, but that "the heavily armed, tightly coordinated groups who took over Crimea's airports and ports at the start of the incursion – they were merely spontaneous 'self-defence groups' who may have acquired their Russian-looking uniforms from local [military] shops (voyentorg)". According to the Ukrainian Association of Gun Owners, Ukrainian law does not allow the selling or carrying of firearms other than for hunting.

On 17 April 2014, President Putin admitted publicly for the first time that Russian special forces were involved in the events of Crimea, for the purposes of protecting local people and creating conditions for a referendum. Later, he admitted that the Russian Armed Forces had blocked the Armed Forces of Ukraine in Crimea during the events.

In response to the question of the presence of Russian troops in Crimea, Russian Minister of Defence Sergey Shoygu said, "Regarding the statements about use of Russian special forces in Ukrainian events, I can only say one thing – it's hard to search for a black cat in a dark room, especially if it's not there," and added cryptically that searching for the cat would be "stupid" if the cat is "intelligent, brave, and polite".

In April 2015, retired Russian Admiral  said that the "little green men" were members of Russian Spetsnaz special forces units. According to his information, Russian troop deployment in Crimea included six helicopter landings and three landings of Ilyushin Il-76 with 500 troops.

See also
Russian military deception
Military history of the Russian Federation
NKVD special groups (1940s–1950s)
People's Armed Forces Maritime Militia (PAFMM, a.k.a. 'Little Blue Men') of China
Ratnik, 'future soldier' equipment for infantry
Wagner Group, private military 
Hybrid warfare

References

External links

Annexation of Crimea by the Russian Federation
False flag operations
Russian special forces operations
Russo-Ukrainian War
Anti-Maidan
Internet memes introduced from Russia
Internet memes introduced in 2014